Churilovka is a rural locality (a settlement) in Velikodvorskoye Rural Settlement, Totemsky District, Vologda Oblast, Russia. The population was 348 as of 2002.

Geography 
Churilovka is located 27 km southwest of Totma (the district's administrative centre) by road. Ukhtanga is the nearest rural locality.

References 

Rural localities in Tarnogsky District